Nicolás Almagro was the defending champion, and defeated Gaël Monfils 6–4, 6–4, in the final.

Seeds

Draw

Finals

Top half

Bottom half

Qualifying

Seeds

Qualifiers

Draw

First qualifier

Second qualifier

Third qualifier

Fourth qualifier

External links
Draw
Qualifying Draw

Abierto Mexicano Telcel - Men's Singles
2009 Abierto Mexicano Telcel